This article is a demography of the population of Grenada including population density, ethnicity, education level, health of the populace, economic status, religious affiliations and other aspects of the population.

Population

According to the 2011 census Grenada has 105,539 inhabitants.

Fertility rate

The fertility rate in Grenada was 2.21 in 2013.

Vital statistics

Other demographics statistics
Demographic statistics according to the World Population Review in 2019:

One birth every 288 minutes	
One death every 480 minutes	
One net migrant every 1440 minutes	
Net gain of one person every 1440 minutes

Demographic statistics according to the CIA World Factbook, unless otherwise indicated:

Nationality
noun:  Grenadian(s)
adjective:  Grenadian

Population
113,949 (2022 est.)

Ethnic groups
African descent 82.4%, mixed 13.3%, East Indian 2.2%, other 1.3%, unspecified 0.9% (2011 est.)

Age structure

0-14 years: 23.23% (male 13,709 /female 12,564)
15-24 years: 14.14% (male 8,034 /female 7,959)
25-54 years: 40.05% (male 23,104 /female 22,187)
55-64 years: 11.69% (male 6,734 /female 6,490)
65 years and over: 10.89% (male 5,774 /female 6,539) (2020 est.)

Median age
total: 33.3 years. Country comparison to the world: 99th
male: 33.1 years 
female: 33.4 years (2020 est.)

Birth rate 
13.94 births/1,000 population (2022 est.) Country comparison to the world: 128th

Death rate
8.31 deaths/1,000 population (2022 est.) Country comparison to the world: 79th

Total fertility rate
1.93 children born/woman (2022 est.) Country comparison to the world: 117th

Net migration rate
-2.43 migrant(s)/1,000 population (2022 est.) Country comparison to the world: 173rd

Population growth rate
0.32% (2022 est.) Country comparison to the world: 169st

Languages
English (official), French patois

Religions
Protestant 49.2% (includes Pentecostal 17.2%, Seventh Day Adventist 13.2%, Anglican 8.5%, Baptist 3.2%, Church of God 2.4%, Evangelical 1.9%, Methodist 1.6%, other 1.2%), Roman Catholic 36%, Jehovah's Witness 1.2%, Rastafarian 1.2%, other 5.5%, none 5.7%, unspecified 1.3% (2011 est.)

Life expectancy at birth 
total population: 75.74 years 
male: 73.13 years 
female: 78.6 years (2022 est.)

Dependency ratios
total dependency ratio: 50.5 (2020 est.)
youth dependency ratio: 35.8 (2020 est.)
elderly dependency ratio: 14.7 (2020 est.)
potential support ratio: 6.8 (2020 est.)

Urbanization
urban population: 36.9% of total population (2022)
rate of urbanization: 0.86% annual rate of change (2020-25 est.)

Obesity - adult prevalence rate
21.3% (2016). Country comparison to the world: 90th

Literacy 
definition: age 15 and over can read and write (2014 est.)
total population: 98.6% 
male: 98.6% 
female: 98.6% (2014 est.)

School life expectancy (primary to tertiary education)
total: 17 years 
male: 16 years 
female: 17 years (2017)

Ethnic groups
The vast majority of the population of Grenada are of African descent (89.4% at the 2001 census). There is also a significant mixed population (8.2%), along with a small European origin minority (0.4%), East Indians (1.6%), and there are small numbers of Lebanese/Syrians (0.04%) and Chinese (0.02%).

Amerindians
Grenada has a small population of pre-Columbian native Caribs. According to the 2001 census there are only 125 Caribs remaining (0.12% of the total population).

Languages
Apart from a 114-year period of French occupancy (1649-1763) English has been the country's official language.  However, over time the minority of the population use a colloquial spoken language considered to be either English-based creole languages or (Grenadian Creole English) and which is said reflects the African, European and Indian heritage of the nation.

The Grenadian creoles originally influenced by French, now contain elements from a variety of Grenadian Creole and a little of the African languages. Grenadian Creole French is mainly spoken in smaller rural areas, but today it can only be heard in a few small pockets of the society. Grenadian Creole French is mainly known as Patois and may have similarities to the Saint Lucian Creole French.

It is believed that the one-time native or indigenous languages were Iñeri and Karina.

Religion
Historically the religious makeup of the islands of Grenada covers the period from first European occupation in the 17th century.  This has always been predominantly Christian and largely Roman Catholic (due to the first occupants being French) and from the 1891 census we get a snapshot of the population and its religious proclivities - over half were Roman Catholic (55%), a third were Church of England (36%), others listed were Wesleyan (6%) and Presbyterian (0.88%).

More recently, according to the 2001 census, 89.1% percent of the population of Grenada is considered Christian, 1.5% is non-Christian and 3.6% has no religion or stated "other" (5.7%).

Roughly one half of Christians are Roman Catholics (44.6% of the total population), a reflection of early French influence on the island, and one half are Protestant. Anglicanism constitutes the largest Protestant group, with 11.5% of the population. Pentecostals are the second largest group (11.3%), followed by Seventh-day Adventists (10.5% of the population).  Other Christians include Baptists (2.9%), Church of God (2.6%), Methodists (1.8%), Evangelicals (1.6%) Jehovah's Witnesses (1.1%), and Brethren Christian (0.5%).

The number of non-Christians is small. These religious groups include the Rastafarian Movement (1.1% of the population), Hinduism (0.2%) and Muslims (0.3%).

References

 
Society of Grenada